Archduchess Maria Theresa of Austria may refer to:

 Archduchess Maria Theresa of Austria (1684–1696)
 Archduchess Maria Theresa of Austria (1717–1780), Holy Roman Empress
 Archduchess Maria Theresa of Austria (1762–1770)
 Archduchess Maria Theresa of Austria (1767–1827), Saxon queen consort
 Archduchess Maria Theresa of Austria (1801–1855), Queen consort of Sardinia
 Archduchess Maria Theresa of Austria (1816-1867), Queen Consort of the Two Sicilies
 Archduchess Maria Theresa of Austria (1862–1933)

See also

 Maria Theresa (disambiguation)
 Archduchess Maria of Austria (disambiguation)
 Archduchess Maria Theresia of Austria-Este